Madhya Pradesh State Highway 38 (MP SH 38) is a State Highway running from Mangod village in Dhar district lying on NH-47 till Barwaha city on MP SH-27.

It passes through Manawar, Dharampuri, Khalghat, Dhamnod,Mandleshwar and Maheshwar.

See Also
List of state highways in Madhya Pradesh
Madhya Pradesh Road Development Corporation Limited

References

State Highways in Madhya Pradesh